Angus Hikairo Macfarlane  is a New Zealand academic and professor at the University of Canterbury.

Biography 
He has mixed Scottish and Māori ancestry, and was born in Rotorua into a family of 14 siblings. His family identify with Ko Te Arawa e waru pumanawa, the "eight beating hearts" of the Te Arawa tribe from the Bay of Plenty region in central North Island.

Academic career 
Before  a career in tertiary education, Macfarlane was a secondary teacher, head teacher, Liaison Officer for the Ministry of Education, and Advisor for Special Education Services.

His tertiary education career began in 1995 with lectureship and associate professorship positions at the University of Waikato. He received a PhD titled Culturally inclusive pedagogy for Māori students experiencing learning and behaviour difficulties in 2003.

Macfarlane moved to the University of Canterbury in 2009. He is the Professor of Māori Research and the director of the Te Ru Rangahau: Maori Education Research Laboratory.

Research 
Macfarlane's research focuses on the organisation of teaching and learning in schools where structures and engagement emphasise Māori preferred ways of teaching and learning.

The Educultural Wheel
Macfarlane's research around these topics resulted in his creation of the "Educultural Wheel", which was first seen in his 2004 book, Kia hiwa ra! Listen to culture: Maori students plea to educators. It was initially a management strategy, designed to increase the development of successful teacher/student interactions with Maori students. It derived from previous research which showed that what Maori students identified as being most beneficial to their learning, was the relationships they had with their teachers. When put into practice, the theory showed significant benefits for not only Maori students, but for students of all cultures. This theory of student management strategy was based around the research and beliefs of many of Macfarlane's favourite theorists from his educational psychology background.

According to Macfarlane, in relation to the Educultural Wheel:

The Educultural Wheel is made up of five interwoven concepts that cover the bases of all aspects of the classroom, these are: Whanaungatanga (Building relationships), Kotahitanga (Ethic of Bonding), Manaakitanga (Ethic of care), Rangatiratanga (Teacher effectiveness), and Pumanawatanga (General classroom morale, pulse, tone).

Awards and honours 

In 2010 he received the Tohu Pae Tawhiti Award from the New Zealand Council for Educational Research for outstanding contributions to Māori research. In 2013 Macfarlane was awarded the University of Canterbury Research Medal in recognition of his outstanding contribution to Māori research and education. He is the first Māori to be awarded the medal. He was elected Fellow of the Royal Society Te Apārangi in 2018.

In the 2021 Queen's Birthday Honours, Macfarlane was appointed a Companion of the New Zealand Order of Merit, for services to education, psychology and Māori.

Personal life 
Macfarlane's wife Sonja Macfarlane is an associate professor at the University of Canterbury.

Selected works 

 Macfarlane A. (2004) Kia hiwa rā! Listen to culture: Māori students' plea to educators. Wellington: NZCER Press. 
 Macfarlane AH. (2007) Discipline, Democracy and Diversity: working with students with behaviour difficulties. Wellington: NZCER Press. 204pp. 
 Macfarlane A., Christensen J. and Mataiti H. (2010) Above the clouds: A Collection of readings for identifying and nurturing Māori students of promise = Ka rewa ake ki ngā kapua. Christchurch: Te Waipounamu Focus Group, University of Canterbury. 231pp. 
 Margrain V. and Macfarlane A. (2011) Responsive pedagogy: Engaging restoratively with challenging behaviour. Wellington: NZCER Press. 273pp. 
 Macfarlane A, Macfarlane S, Teirney S, Kuntz JR, Rarere-Briggs B, Currie M, and Macfarlane R. (2019) The Hikairo Schema: Culturally responsive teaching and learning in early childhood education settings Wellington: NZCER Press. 32pp.

References

Further reading
Pere, R. (1994). Ako: concepts and learning the Maori tradition. Wellington: Expo
 http://www.maramatanga.ac.nz/person/professor-angus-macfarlane
 https://web.archive.org/web/20140401131634/http://www.education.canterbury.ac.nz/teachereducation/people/macfarlane.shtml

External links 

 University of Canterbury staff and research profile web pages

Living people
New Zealand Māori schoolteachers
New Zealand schoolteachers
New Zealand people of Scottish descent
People from Rotorua
University of Otago alumni
New Zealand Māori academics
Ngāti Whakaue people
Year of birth missing (living people)
Fellows of the Royal Society of New Zealand
Companions of the New Zealand Order of Merit